The red-rumped swallow (Cecropis daurica) is a small passerine bird in the swallow family. It breeds in open hilly country of temperate southern Europe and Asia from Portugal and Spain to Japan, India, Sri Lanka and tropical Africa. The Indian and African birds are resident, but European and other Asian birds are migratory. They winter in Africa or India and are vagrants to Christmas Island and northern Australia.

Red-rumped swallows are somewhat similar in habits and appearance to the other aerial insectivores, such as the related swallows and the unrelated swifts (order Apodiformes). They have blue upperparts and dusky underparts.

They resemble barn swallows, but are darker below and have pale or reddish rumps, face and neck collar. They lack a breast band, but have black undertails. They are fast fliers and they swoop on insects while airborne. They have broad but pointed wings.

Red-rumped swallows build quarter-sphere nests with a tunnel entrance lined with mud collected in their beaks, and lay 3 to 6 eggs. They normally nest under cliff overhangs in their mountain homes, but will readily adapt to buildings such as mosques and bridges.

They do not normally form large breeding colonies, but are gregarious outside the breeding season. Many hundreds can be seen at a time on the plains of India.

Taxonomy
The red-rumped swallow was formally described by Finnish-Swedish clergyman, explorer and natural scientist Erik Laxmann in 1769 as Hirundo daurica, using a specimen from Mount Schlangen, near Zmeinogorsk, Russia. It is now usually placed in the genus Cecropis created by German scientist Friedrich Boie in 1826, although it is arguable how distinct this genus is from Hirundo, and some authorities retain it in that genus. Boie's genus name Cecropis is from the Ancient Greek for an Athenian woman.  The specific daurica is derived from Dauria, a mountainous region to the east of Lake Baikal in Russia. The alternative genus Hirundo is the Latin word for "swallow". Some authorities consider the West African swallow to be a subspecies of the red-rumped swallow.

This species is believed to form a superspecies complex with Cecropis striolata. The widely distributed population shows a lot of variation and several have been named as subspecies.  Many of these are migratory and overlap in their wintering ranges and field identification of these forms is not reliable. The Sri Lankan breeding population hyperythra is a resident, and are now usually considered a distinct species, the Sri Lanka swallow. The underparts are deep chestnut and the nuchal collar is not well marked.

The population in mainland India, C. d. erythropygia, has the rump patch uniform dark chestnut without any dark shaft-streaks. The tail fork is shallow and the white patch on the inner web of the outer-tail feathers is indistinct. C. d. japonica breeds in eastern Asia and winters in Thailand, Burma, India and northern Australia. They are heavily streaked on the underside and have faint streaks on the rump. The population along the Himalayas, C. d. nipalensis, migrates to peninsular India in winter and breeds from Kulu in the west to Bhutan and Arunachal Pradesh in the east. This population has the rump paler with dark shaft streaks. Subspecies C. d. rufula of Southern Europe, the Iberian Peninsula east to Baluchistan and Kashmir is resident and winters further south. The chestnut of rump fades to white towards the tail base. The nominate population breeds in Mongolia and Trans-Baikailia wintering in South and Southeast Asia. Subspecies C. d. gephyra of inner Mongolia is considered indistinguishable from the nominate subspecies. The African populations include C. d. kumboensis from the highlands of Sierra Leone and Cameroon; C. d. melanocrissus of the Ethiopian highlands and C. d. emini of Sudan, Uganda, Kenya and Zambia. Many of the variations are separable only on tail and wing lengths and these vary with overlap across populations.

Distribution and habitat

The red-rumped swallow breeds across southern Europe and Asia east to southern Siberia and Japan. These populations, along with Moroccan birds,  are migratory, wintering in sub-Saharan Africa or south Asia. There are resident races in Africa in a broad belt from West Africa east to Ethiopia and then south to Tanzania, and most Indian and Sri Lanka breeders are also year-round residents. The African and Asian subspecies may undertake local seasonal movements. This species is a regular vagrant outside its breeding range.

Behaviour and ecology
These swallows are usually found over grassland where they hawk insects. They may sometimes take advantage of grass fires and grazing cattle that flush insects into the air.

Breeding

It is thought that the sequence "open-nest" to "closed nest" to "retort nest" represents the evolutionary development in the mud-building swallows, and individual species follow this order of construction. A retort builder like red-rumped swallow starts with an open cup, closes it, and then builds the entrance tunnel. It has been proposed that the development of closed nests reduced competition between males for copulations with the females. Since mating occurs inside the nest, the difficulty of access means other males are excluded. This reduction in competition permits the dense breeding colonies typical of the Delichon and Petrochelidon genera, but colonial breeding is not inevitable; most Cecropis species are solitary nesters.

Conservation status 

The International Union for Conservation of Nature (IUCN) is the organisation responsible for assessing the conservation status of species. A species is assessed as subject to varying levels of threat if it has a small, fragmented or declining range, or if the total population is less than 10,000 mature individuals, or numbers have dropped by more than 10% in ten years or with a continuing decline over generations. The red-rumped swallow has a huge range and a population numbered in millions. It is not known to be seriously declining in range or numbers, so it is classed as Least Concern.

The red-rumped swallow is extending its range northward in Europe, colonising France and Romania in recent decades. The European population is estimated at 100,000 to 430,000 breeding pairs or 300,000 to 1,290,000 individuals.

Gallery

Notes

References

External links

Photos and videos
Ageing and sexing (PDF; 2.0 MB) by Javier Blasco-Zumeta & Gerd-Michael Heinze

red-rumped swallow
Birds of Africa
Birds of Eurasia
red-rumped swallow